= Berberè Pizzeria =

Italian restaurant chain

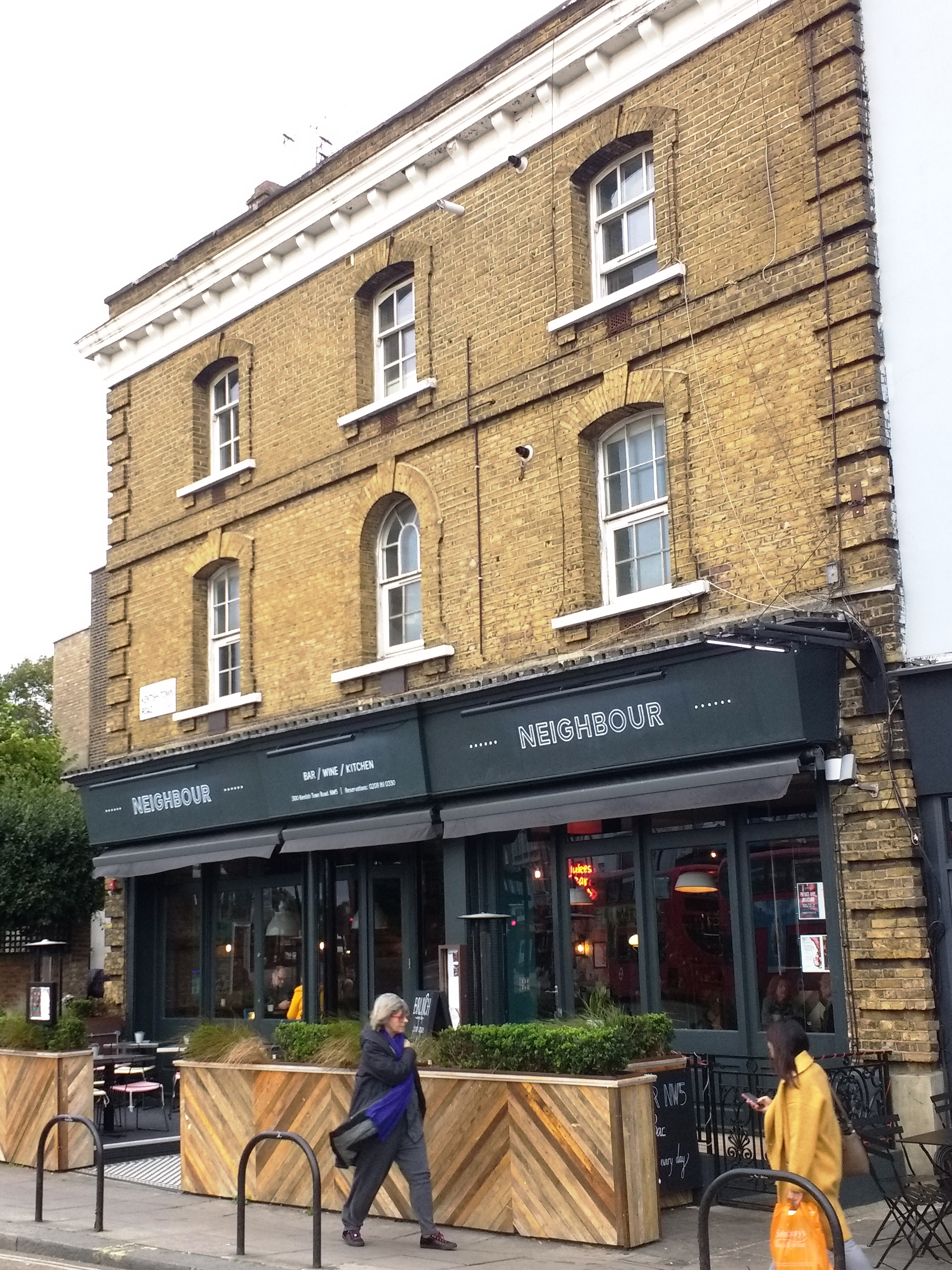
300 Kentish Town Road, London, in 2017 - now a Berbere Pizzeria

Berberè Pizzeria is an Italian pizza restaurant chain.

Berberè was founded by Calabrian brothers Matteo and Salvatore Aloe in Bologna.

Berberè has 21 branches in Italy and five in London.
